Oenothera pubescens, known commonly as the South American evening-primrose, is a plant in the evening primrose family native to the Southwestern U.S. (southeastern California, Arizona, New Mexico, and western Texas); Mexico (more than 20 states); Guatemala; and Western South America (Colombia, Ecuador, and Peru). It is used locally in folk medicine.

References

External links
Jepson Manual treatment for Oenothera pubescens
Malezas-de-Mexico: Oenothera pubescens - pictures and information — (in Spanish)

pubescens
Plants described in 1825
Night-blooming plants
Medicinal plants
Flora of Arizona
Flora of New Mexico
Flora of Texas
Flora of Mexico
Flora of Guatemala
Flora of Colombia
Flora of Ecuador
Flora of Peru
Flora of the California desert regions
Flora of the Sonoran Deserts
Flora of the Chihuahuan Desert
Flora without expected TNC conservation status